Roland Büchner (born 16 February 1954) is a German church musician and conductor. He has been the director at the Regensburg Cathedral, conducting the boys' choir Regensburger Domspatzen.

Career 

He has been from 1994 Domkapellmeister at the Regensburg Cathedral, succeeding Georg Ratzinger. The boys' choir Regensburger Domspatzen (literally: Regensburg Cathedral Sparrows) performs in the liturgy at the cathedral every Sunday during school time, and in concert internationally. Büchner was appointed honorary professor in Regensburg in 2009.

References

External links 
 
 Roland Büchner Regensburger Domspatzen
 

German choral conductors
German male conductors (music)
1954 births
Living people
People from Karlstadt am Main
21st-century German conductors (music)
21st-century German male musicians